NHL 2K9 is an ice hockey sports video game  made by 2K Sports, part of the NHL 2K series, and published on the PlayStation 2, PlayStation 3, Wii, and Xbox 360 consoles. It features former Columbus Blue Jackets left winger Rick Nash on its cover.

Development and release
A demo was released on August 13, 2008, on the PlayStation Network and on August 21 on Xbox Live Marketplace.

Reception

The game received "mixed or average reviews" according to the review aggregation website Metacritic.  In Japan, where the PlayStation 2, PlayStation 3, and Xbox 360 versions were ported for release on April 29, 2009, Famitsu gave it a score of two sixes, one five, and one six for the PS3 and Xbox 360 versions; and three fives and one six for the PS2 version.

References

External links

 Official website, via the Internet Archive

2K Sports games
09
Ice hockey video games
Wii games
Xbox 360 games
PlayStation 2 games
PlayStation 3 games
2008 video games
Video games developed in the United States
Video games set in 2008
Video games set in 2009
Take-Two Interactive games